Steven Petkov (born 7 May 1995) is a Bulgarian professional footballer who plays as a forward for Portuguese club Moreirense.

Career
Born in Sofia, Petkov arrived in Levski Sofia's youth academy in 2004, from Botev Vratsa, and progressed through the club's youth academy. He made his first team debut at 16 years and 351 days, when he came off the bench against Kaliakra Kavarna on 23 April 2012.

Ludogorets Razgrad
On 3 July 2014, Petkov joined the Bulgarian champion Ludogorets Razgrad. On 5 August, Petkov was released from the team due to a match-fixing scandal involving Bulgaria U19.

Match-fixing scandal 
Just before the UEFA Euro U19 2014 Petkov was released from the Bulgaria U19. After the team came back from the tournament it was announced that there had been a scheme for match-fixing, according to which the Bulgarian team should lose the matches with big results. Dimitar Gyaurov was arrested for this. Later it was announced that Petkov had been part of the scheme. He talked with other players from the team to join him and to lose the matches for money, but the player Stefan Velkov revealed this to head coach Aleksandar Dimitrov. On 5 August 2014, the Bulgarian Football Union announced that Petkov is with blocked rights to play football until the investigation is over. Later that day Ludogorets announced that Petkov is released from the team due to this scandal. On 7 May 2015, Petkov gained back his rights to play after he was not indicted.

On 8 April 2016 Petkov was found not guilty in taking part of the scheme. Same day was found out that the footballer who revealed to the coach about the scheme was Preslav Petrov and together they were witnesses on the case.

Beroe Stara Zagora
In June 2015, Petkov signed a contract with Beroe Stara Zagora.

Montana
Petkov played one season for Montana but left the club in July 2017.

Botev Plovdiv

2017–18
On 14 August 2017, Petkov signed a two-year contract with Botev Plovdiv. A few days later, Petkov made a debut and scored a goal during the 1–2 defeat from PFC Cherno More Varna. On 27 October Petkov scored the winning goal for the 1–2 away win over Pirin Blagoevgrad. A week later, on 3 November, Steven Petkov scored just a few seconds after he came on the pitch as a substitute for the 1–1 draw with Slavia Sofia.

Despite scoring numerous important goals, Steven Petkov was never included in the starting line-up until 12 December. He used the opportunity to impress and scored a hat-trick for the 5–0 win over Litex Lovech in the quarter final of the Bulgarian Cup.

On 12 March, on day when Botev Plovdiv celebrated 106 years from its foundation, Steven Petkov scored for the dramatic 2–4 away win over FC Vereya. On 31 March 2018 Steven scored the only goal for Botev Plovdiv during the 1–4 away defeat from CSKA Sofia. A week later, on 6 April, Petkov came on as a substitute and scored the winning goal for the 1–0 victory over Levski Sofia.

On 14 April Steven Petkov scored during the 3–2 away defeat by Beroe Stara Zagora. A week later, on 21 April he scored again in Stara Zagora, this time during the 2–2 away draw with FC Vereya. On 29 April Steven Petkov scored a wonderful goal for the 2–1 home win over CSKA Sofia and won the award for man of the match. A week later, on 5 May, during the first half he scored again but this time Botev Plovdiv was dramatically defeated with 3–2 by Levski Sofia.

2018–19

On 28 July 2018 Steven Petkov scored his first goal for the season for the 0–2 away win over Septemvri Sofia. He was selected for the man of the match. On 3 August Petkov scored during a 2–0 home win over Etar Veliko Tarnovo. A week later, on 11 August, he scored again but this time his team lost the away game against Beroe Stara Zagora.

Feirense
On 4 January 2019, Petkov was transferred to Portuguese Primeira Liga side Feirense for an undisclosed fee, signing a contract until the summer of 2022. On 10 February 2019, he scored his first goal for the club, a bicycle kick, in a 1–3 loss to Sporting. Feirense announced on 1 September 2019, that Petkov had been loaned out to Czech club MFK Karviná until the end of 2019.

Club statistics

Club

References

External links
 
 
  
 Profile at LevskiSofia.info

1995 births
Living people
People from Vratsa
Bulgarian footballers
Bulgarian expatriate footballers
Bulgaria youth international footballers
Association football wingers
Association football forwards
First Professional Football League (Bulgaria) players
Primeira Liga players
Liga Portugal 2 players
Czech First League players
PFC Levski Sofia players
PFC Ludogorets Razgrad players
PFC Beroe Stara Zagora players
FC Montana players
Botev Plovdiv players
C.D. Feirense players
Bulgarian expatriate sportspeople in Portugal
Bulgarian expatriate sportspeople in the Czech Republic
Expatriate footballers in Portugal
Expatriate footballers in the Czech Republic
MFK Karviná players